Daoud Amoun (1869 – 1922) was a Lebanese Maronite Christian politician who served as speaker of the Administrative Committee of Greater Lebanon from 1920 to 1922.

Born in Deir al-Qamar, Amoun moved to France, where he studied law. He returned to Lebanon, and became known for writing patriotic poems about the country. Before the first world war, he moved with his children to Egypt.

In 1918, he headed a delegation to Paris Peace Conference, where he demanded an independent Lebanese state. Two years later, the State of Greater Lebanon was established, and he was appointed as a member of the Administrative Committee, which was the first legislative body. During the first session, he was elected as its speaker. He is the first legislative speaker of Lebanon.

References 

Legislative speakers of Lebanon
Lebanese Maronites
1869 births
1922 deaths
20th-century Lebanese politicians